Bryan Mullins (born January 13, 1987) is a former American basketball player and current college basketball coach. He is currently head coach of the Southern Illinois Salukis men's basketball team.

Playing career
Mullins was a four-year letterwinner at Southern Illinois for coach Chris Lowery where he was part of the Salukis' Sweet 16 run in the 2007 NCAA tournament. He was also a two-time Academic All-American at the school, as well as a two-time Missouri Valley Conference Defensive Player of the Year. Following graduation, Mullins played four years of professional basketball in France.

Coaching career
After retiring from professional basketball, Mullins joined Porter Moser's staff at Loyola, rising the ranks from director of basketball operations up to associate head coach. He was on staff during Loyola's historic Final Four run at the 2018 NCAA tournament.

On March 20, 2019, Mullins was named the 14th head coach in Southern Illinois history, replacing Barry Hinson.

In Mullins' first season as Salukis head coach, he led the team to a 10-8 conference record including a seven-game winning streak and finished 5th despite the team being picked last in the conference before the season.  Mullins was picked 2nd for Missouri Valley Conference coach of the year trailing Northern Iowa's Ben Jacobson.

Personal life
Mullins comes from a basketball family. His father Mike is the founder of the Illinois Wolves AAU program, while his older brother Brendan is a former college basketball player at Saint Michael's College and assistant basketball coach at Southern Illinois Salukis.

Head coaching record

References

External links
 Bryan Mullins on Twitter
 Southern Illinois profile
 Loyola Chicago profile

1984 births
Living people
American expatriate basketball people in France
American men's basketball coaches
American men's basketball players
Basketball coaches from Illinois
Basketball players from Illinois
Champagne Châlons-Reims Basket players
College men's basketball head coaches in the United States
JL Bourg-en-Bresse players
Loyola Ramblers men's basketball coaches
People from Downers Grove, Illinois
Southern Illinois Salukis men's basketball coaches
Southern Illinois Salukis men's basketball players
Sportspeople from DuPage County, Illinois